= Trkalište =

Residential area of Šabac, Serbia

Trkalište is a residential area of Šabac, a city in Serbia. Sometimes in the past on this place was a racetrack (trkalište). Four streets are embracing the old racetrack where now there are modern condos: Prote Smiljanić, Jovana Cvijića, Cerska and Norveška Street.

The most notable administrative and sports buildings on Trkalište are the city heating plant constructed in 1982, General Medical Centre and football stadium Mačva, the home ground of FK Mačva Šabac.
